The Musei Civici di Padova or degli Eremitani is a complex of museums and historic sites, centered on the former convent of the Eremitani (Augustinian order), and its famous Cappella degli Scrovegni with its Giotto fresco masterpieces. The complex is located on Piazza Eremitani, at the edge of the historic center of Padua, region of Veneto, Italy. The complex includes halls of archaeological objects and – in the nearby Palazzo Zuckermann – a museum of modern and medieval applied art.

History
The original collection arose with the acquisition of works from suppressed ecclesiastical institutions, including in 1783 of the convent of San Giovanni da Verdara and in 1810 of many other institutions. In 1825, the abbot Giuseppe Furlanetto displayed his collection of Roman and Greek lapidary inscriptions in the logge del Palazzo della Ragione. The collection was expanded by the donation of 1864 by Leonardo Capodilista. Under the patron Andrea Gloria, this collection and other works came under the ownership of the commune, leading to the formation of the Pinacoteca, as well as civic library and archive.

Pinacoteca
The painting gallery includes works by Lorenzo Veneziano, Giovanni da Bologna, Francesco Squarcione, Jacopo Bellini, Lorenzo Costa, Girolamo Romano, called il Romanino, Paolo Veronese, Giorgione, Palma il Giovane, Quentin Metsys, Antonio Canova, Andrea Briosco, and Tiziano Aspetti.

Among specific works in the collection are:
 Crucifix by Giotto derived from the altar of the Cappella degli Scrovegni
 Angels by Guariento derived from the Cappella della Reggia Carrarese
 Madonna and Child by Boccaccio Boccaccino
 Dinner at House of Simon and a Crucifixion by Jacopo Tintoretto
 St Joseph and Child Jesus, Madonna, Christ in the Garden by Giambattista Tiepolo

References

External links
 

Art museums and galleries in Veneto
Augustinian monasteries in Italy
Museums in Padua